Celaenorrhinus lourentis is a species of butterfly in the family Hesperiidae. It is found in the Kakamega Forest of Kenya.

References

Butterflies described in 1976
lourentis